Mark Bryan Hicks (born January 24, 1957) is a former American football safety who played three seasons with the Cincinnati Bengals in the National Football League (NFL).

References

1957 births
Living people
American football safeties
Cincinnati Bengals players
McNeese Cowboys football players
Sportspeople from Lake Charles, Louisiana
Players of American football from Louisiana